The George McKenna Story is a 1986 biographical television film directed by Eric Laneuville, which stars Laneuville's St. Elsewhere co-star Denzel Washington and Lynn Whitfield. It involves the events at George Washington Preparatory High School in South Los Angeles. The film was later (after Denzel Washington became a superstar) re-released on video under the title Hard Lessons.

Cast
Denzel Washington as school principal George McKenna
Lynn Whitfield as Bobbie Maxwell
Earl Billings as Mr. Rogers
Ray Buktenica as Alan Keith
Akosua Busia as Cynthia Byers
Richard Masur as Ben Proctor
Michael Milburn as Brimm Leader

Reception
The George McKenna Story won a Christopher Award in the category of "Television Specials".

At Rotten Tomatoes the film received two negative reviews from critics.

References

External links
 
 

1986 television films
1986 films
American television films
American biographical films
Biographical films about educators
Cultural depictions of American men
Black people in art
Films directed by Eric Laneuville
Films scored by Herbie Hancock
African-American Roman Catholicism
1980s American films